Waylander  is a fantasy novel by British writer David Gemmell, published in 1986. It is the first of three Waylander stories, followed by Waylander II: In the Realm of the Wolf and Waylander III: Hero In The Shadows.

Plot summary
The assassin Waylander is doomed to travel the world in search of revenge against those who killed his family.  After allying with a priest, a fellow assassin, a young woman and three children in her charge, Waylander gradually redeems himself and tries to save the kingdom that he plummeted into chaos.

Waylander The Slayer
Waylander The Slayer''' is the main character of Waylander, Waylander II: In the Realm of the Wolf and Hero in the Shadows.  An anti-hero like the Earl of the Bronze in Legend'', Waylander appears at first immoral, an assassin with only mercenary motivations, however is revealed through a series of flashbacks to be a tortured soul, once noble, and now seeking redemption for the singular evil act that defined his legend - the regicide of Niallad, a kind-hearted and well-loved Drenai King.

References

1986 British novels
British fantasy novels
Drenai
Novels by David Gemmell
Century (imprint) books